Sesh Anka is a 1963 Indian Bengali-language thriller film directed by Haridas Bhattacharya and made by Kalpana Movies, Kolkata. This film was loosely inspired by the 1958 film Chase a Crooked Shadow. The story and screenplay was written by Rajkumar Moitra. Uttam Kumar shocked the audience by his superb performance as a cold blooded murderer. Critics stated this movie as one of the best thrillers in Bengali Cinema. The film was remade in Tamil in 1964 as Puthiya Paravai and was an inspiration for the Hindi movie Khoj (1989).

Plot 
Widower Sudhangsu is going to be married to Soma, daughter of Sir Haraprasad. Sudhangsu is presented as a cheerful person who loves his would-be partner Soma and adores her with all his heart, occasionally gifting her with ornaments. He already declares that his first wife Kalpana committed suicide on a railway track in Burma, stating that she was mentally challenged. At the time of Sudhangsu's second marriage, a local senior advocate, Suren Banerjee comes with a lady who claims herself as Sudhangsu's first wife. Sudhangsu strongly denies and alleged that she is an imposter. In the meantime, a mysterious person named Samadder invades Sudhangsu's house and steal some ornaments of the deceased Kalpana. The case goes for a trial to determine whether the unknown lady is really Kalpana or not. Advocate Suren Banerjee examines all the witnesses attached to the case. The courtroom drama wrestles to defend the unknown lady's position against her proclaimed husband. Sudhangsu starts losing his sanity with time growing out of his hand. Having no other witness to support his case, Sudhangsu's Barrister Mr. Mitter compels his client to telegram Deben Sen, brother of Kalpana to determine the identity of his sister. The story revolves around the activities of Sudhangsu and his past as the courtroom drama. Deben, however, recognizes the unknown lady as his sister without an air of doubt. Sudhangsu having lost all his reasons confesses how the lady couldn't be Kalpana as he himself had killed her at Burma when she was not ready to divorce Sudhanshu. Samadder being present at the scene comes from behind the curtain and reveals himself as a private investigator being hired by Deben to investigate his sister's death. The story concludes with the tagline "Crime does not pay".

Cast 
 Uttam Kumar as Sudhanshu Gupta 
 Bikash Roy as Karanjakkho Samadder
 Sharmila Tagore as Soma 
 Kamal Mitra as Adv. Suren Banerjee
 Utpal Dutt as Barrister Mitter
 Sabitri Chatterjee as Lata Bose/ Fake Kalpana
 Pahari Sanyal as Sir Haraprasad
 Tarun Kumar Chatterjee as Deben Sen
 Jiben Bose as Mamababu

Soundtrack

Remake
The film is remade in Tamil in 1964 Puthiya Paravai starring Tamil film star Sivaji Ganeshan, Sowcar Janaki and B. Saroja Devi. In 1989 the film was remade in Hindi as Khoj directed by Keshu Ramsay. The film starring Rishi Kapoor, Naseeruddin Shah, Kimi Katkar and Danny Denzongpa music director is Bappi Lahiri.

References

External links
 

Bengali-language Indian films
1963 films
Indian mystery thriller films
Bengali films remade in other languages
Indian courtroom films
1960s Bengali-language films
1960s thriller films